Unusual or The Unusual or The Unusuals may refer to:

Film and TV
The Unusuals, a 2009 TV series.

Music
The Unusual, an El Da Sensei album
Unusual (album) Giuni Russo 2006

Songs
Unusual (song) Trey Songz
"Unusual", song by Francesca Battistelli from If We're Honest
"Unusual", song by Mohsen Chavoshi

See also
Anomaly (disambiguation)
Wikipedia:Unusual articles
:Category:Lists of things considered unusual